Reggio Emilia AV Mediopadana is a high speed railway station in Reggio Emilia, Italy. The station is located on the Milan–Bologna high-speed railway and Reggio Emilia-Guastalla railway. The train services are operated by Trenitalia, Nuovo Trasporto Viaggiatori and Ferrovie Emilia Romagna.

Since 15 December 2013 the station has been connected to the regional line Reggio Emilia-Guastalla railway, offering a connection to the centre of Reggio Emilia.

Train services
The station is served by the following service(s):

High speed services (Frecciarossa) Turin - Milan - Bologna - Florence - Rome - Naples - Salerno
High speed services (Frecciarossa) Milan - Bologna - Ancona - Pescara - Foggia – Bari
High speed services (Italo) Turin - Milan - Bologna - Florence - Rome - Naples - Salerno
High speed services (Italo) Turin - Milan - Bologna - Ancona
Local services (Treno regionale) Reggio Emilia - Bagnolo in Piano - Guastalla

Bus services

5M Reggio Emilia - Reggio Emilia AV Mediopadana

References

This article is based upon a translation of the Italian language version as at June 2014.

AV Mediopadana Railway Station
Railway stations in Emilia-Romagna
Railway stations opened in 2013
2013 establishments in Italy
Railway stations in Italy opened in the 21st century